The 2010 Sparta Prague Open was a professional tennis tournament played on clay courts. It was part of the 2010 ITF Women's Circuit. It took place at Tennis Club Sparta Prague in Prague, Czech Republic between 10 and 16 May 2010 with a $50,000 prize money.

Singles entrants

Seeds

 Rankings are of 3 May 2010

Other entrants
The following players received wildcards into the singles main draw:
  Petra Cetkovská
  Tereza Jankovská
  Aleksandra Romanova
  Kateřina Kramperová

The following players received entry from the qualifying draw:
  Lu Jingjing
  Michaela Hončová
  Lenka Juríková
  Emma Laine

The following players received entry by a lucky loser spot:
  Daniëlle Harmsen
  Lena-Marie Hoffmann
  Sarah-Rebecca Sekulic

Finals

Singles

 Lucie Hradecká defeated  Ajla Tomljanović, 6–1, 7–6(7–4)

Doubles

 Ksenia Lykina /  Maša Zec Peškirič defeated  Petra Cetkovská /  Eva Hrdinová, 6–3, 6–4

External links
Official Website
Draws on ITF website

Sparta Prague Open
Clay court tennis tournaments
WTA Prague Open
Sparta Prague Open